A sandal is an open type of outdoor footwear also known as a shoe

Places
 Konar Sandal, archaeological site in Kermān Province, Iran
 Konar Sandal, Iran, a village in Hoseynabad Rural District, Esmaili District, Anbarabad County, Kerman Province, Iran
 Šandal, a village in Slovakia
 Sandal, Afghanistan
 Sandal, Iran, a village in Khuzestan Province, Iran
 Sandal, Tarsus a village in Tarsus district of Mersin Province, Turkey
 Sandal, Wakefield, West Yorkshire, England
 Sandal Castle, site of the Battle of Wakefield in the Wars of the Roses
 Sandals Cay, part of the Sandals Royal Caribbean all-inclusive resort
 Sarab-e Sandal, a village in Honam Rural District, in the Central District of Selseleh County, Lorestan Province, Iran
 Seat Sandal, a fell in the English Lake District
 Sandals, Missouri, a community in the United States

Footwear
 Bernardo Sandals, American footwear
 Episcopal sandals, or pontifical sandals
 Rainbow Sandals, an American company specializes in men's and women's leather, hemp, and rubber flip-flops
 Saltwater sandals, American footwear
 Sandals of Jesus Christ, a medieval relic displayed at Prum Abbey in Germany
 T-bar sandal, American closed, low-cut shoe

Other uses
 Sandal (textile), a light material
 Hermes Fastening his Sandal, Roman marble copies of a lost Greek bronze original sculpture
 Mujhay Sandal Kar Do, a Pakistani drama television series
 Mysore Sandal Soap, a soap brand in India
 Sandal and Walton railway station, railway station between Sandal and Walton in West Yorkshire, England
 Sandals Church, a church in Riverside, California, USA
 Sandals Resorts, a Caribbean luxury resorts operator
 Sandalwood, aromatic plant
 SS-4 Sandal, NATO reporting name for the R-12 Dvina theatre ballistic missile
 The Sandals, American surf rock band

Persons with the surname Sandal or Sandals
 Bjørg Sandal (born 1955), Norwegian director and politician
 Christian Sandal (1872–1951), Norwegian actor and theatre director 
 Dominik Sandal
 Liz Sandals (born 1947), Canadian politician 
 Mustafa Sandal (born 1970), Turkish pop music singer-songwriter, record producer
 Nils R. Sandal  (born 1950), Norwegian politician
 Reidar Sandal (born 1949), Norwegian politician

See also
 Sandalwood, a class of woods from trees in the genus Santalum